Frank Conner (born January 11, 1946) is an American professional golfer who played on the PGA Tour, Nationwide Tour, and Champions Tour. He was also an accomplished amateur tennis player. He, Ellsworth Vines and G. H. "Pete" Bostwick Jr. are the only men to play in the U.S. Open in both tennis and golf.

Life and career
Conner was born in Vienna, Austria, where his father was stationed with the U.S. Army. He competed in the U.S. Open in tennis in 1965, 1966, and 1967. He attended Trinity University in San Antonio, Texas, graduating in 1970 with a degree in Business Administration. While at Trinity he was an All-American in tennis in 1968. He was elected to Trinity's Hall of Fame in 2001.

Conner gave up playing tennis and turned to golf, turning professional in 1971. He failed four times at qualifying school before finally getting his tour card and joining the PGA Tour in 1975. He played on the PGA Tour from 1975 to 1989 and again in 1992. He finished second four times: in 1979 to Hubert Green at the First NBC New Orleans Open, in 1981 to Dave Barr in a five-man playoff at the Quad Cities Open, in 1982 to Tom Watson in a playoff at the Sea Pines Heritage, and in 1984 to George Archer at the Bank of Boston Classic. He won the 1988 Deposit Guaranty Golf Classic which was played opposite the Masters Tournament - it was an official money event but not an official win on the PGA Tour. His best finish in a major championship was a T-6 at the 1981 U.S. Open.

Conner played on the Ben Hogan Tour (now Nationwide Tour) from 1990–91 and 1993-95. He won twice in 1991 at the Ben Hogan Knoxville Open and the Ben Hogan Tulsa Open and finished fifth on the money list to regain his PGA Tour card.

After turning 50 in 1996, Conner played on the Senior PGA Tour (now Champions Tour) from 1996 to 2002. His best finishes on this tour were a pair of second places: at the 1997 The Transamerica and the 1998 Kroger Senior Classic in a five-man playoff.

Professional wins (7)

Ben Hogan Tour wins (2)

Ben Hogan Tour playoff record (1–0)

Other wins (5)
1978 Southern Texas PGA Championship
1982 King Hassan Open, Southern Texas PGA Championship
1983 Texas State Open
1988 Deposit Guaranty Golf Classic (unofficial PGA Tour win)

Playoff record
PGA Tour playoff record (0–2)

Champions Tour playoff record (0–1)

Results in major championships

CUT = missed the halfway cut
WD = withdrew
"T" = tied

See also
1974 PGA Tour Qualifying School graduates
1991 Ben Hogan Tour graduates

References

External links

American male golfers
American male tennis players
PGA Tour golfers
PGA Tour Champions golfers
Korn Ferry Tour graduates
Golfers from San Antonio
Sportspeople from San Antonio
Sportspeople from Las Vegas
Sportspeople from Vienna
Tennis people from Texas
Trinity Tigers athletes 
Trinity Tigers men's tennis players
American expatriate sportspeople in Austria
1946 births
Living people